Charmeil is a commune in the Allier department in central France.

Geography 

A weather station is located on the site of the airport, elevation: .

Administration 
List of successive mayors:
 2001-2014: Andrée-Claude Petillat
 2014-current: Franck Gonzales

Population

Demography

Economy 
Charmeil has a commercial area with signs: Mr Bricolage, Jardiland, a GiFi store, Lidl, and local merchants.

Culture and Heritage 
 Charmeil Castle, which was the summer residence of Marshal Philippe Pétain in 1943 and which was held including a secret meeting between Pierre Laval and the advisor of German Rudolf Rahn embassy minister in August 1942.
 Church
 Boutiron bridge (on departmental road 27, between Charmeil and Creuzier-le-Vieux, Monument historique since 2021)

See also
Vichy — Charmeil Airport
Communes of the Allier department

References

Communes of Allier
Allier communes articles needing translation from French Wikipedia